BroadTV is a  direct broadcast satellite television provider in Nepal.

References

High-definition television
Direct broadcast satellite services
Mass media companies established in 2016
Television channels in Nepal